Sergei Cortez (18 February 1935 – 26 June 2016) was a Belarusian composer.

Cortez was born in San Antonio, Chile. He lived for most of his early life in Argentina, and emigrated with his parents to Minsk in the Byelorussian SSR in 1955 at the age of 20.

Works
One-act operas Jubilee and The Bear after stories by Anton Chekhov. The Bear was premiered by Alexander Anisimov and the Belarusian Philharmonic. Jubilee was premiered at the Moscow State Academic Chamber Musical Theatre B. A. Pokrovsky.
Visit of the Lady «Визит дамы»

Selected filmography
Adventures in a City that does not Exist (1974)

References

1935 births
2016 deaths
People from Valparaíso Region
Chilean emigrants to the Soviet Union
Belarusian composers
Belarusian people of Chilean descent
Belarusian people of Russian descent
Chilean people of Russian descent
Soviet male classical composers
Male classical composers
20th-century classical composers
20th-century male musicians
Recipients of the Byelorussian SSR State Prize